Paul James Selvey Clinton (born 30 August 1983) is an English former first-class cricketer.

Clinton was born at Dartford in August 1983. He was educated at Colfe's School, before going up to Keble College, Oxford. While studying at Oxford he played first-class cricket, making his debut for Oxford UCCE against Kent at Oxford in 2004. He played first-class cricket for Oxford UCCE on two further occasions in 2005, in addition to making three first-class appearances for Oxford University against Cambridge University in The University Matches of 2004, 2005 and 2006. Playing in six first-class matches, Clinton scored 67 runs with a high score of 24. His uncle Grahame Clinton and cousin Richard Clinton both played first-class cricket.

Notes and references

External links

1983 births
Living people
Sportspeople from Dartford
People educated at Colfe's School
Alumni of Keble College, Oxford
English cricketers
Oxford MCCU cricketers
Oxford University cricketers